Flock! (stylized as FLOCK!) is a puzzle video game developed by Proper Games and published by Capcom for Windows, PlayStation Network and Xbox Live Arcade. It was released for Microsoft Windows on April 7, 2009 through Steam and Stardock's digital distribution service Impulse, Xbox Live Arcade on April 8, 2009 and PlayStation Network on April 9, 2009.

Gameplay
The player controls a UFO ("The Flocker") and is tasked with herding farm animals (sheep, cows, chickens, and pigs) back to the mothership, "The Mother Flocker". This is challenging due to the hazardous environments the animals exist in—the players must defend their flock against hungry predators, avoid pits of death, and send their animals flying with catapults. There are 55 single-player levels that span across three seasons: summer, autumn, and winter. There is also a cooperative play mode.

Extensibility
The game also grants access to the same map editor the developers used to make the official levels, so players can make their own puzzles. Players are able to share maps with others via a persistent map server. PC and PS3 users are able to share maps between the two platforms.

Reception

The game received "mixed or average reviews" on all platforms according to the review aggregation website Metacritic.

References

External links
Official website

2009 video games
Capcom games
PlayStation 3 games
PlayStation Network games
Puzzle video games
Video games developed in the United Kingdom
Windows games
Xbox 360 Live Arcade games